

Preliminary round

November 23, 1919

|}

January 20, 1920

|}

January 25, 1920

|}

First round

February 8, 1920

|}

February 21, 1920

|}

Second round

March 14, 1920

|}

Quarter-finals

May 13, 1920

|}

Semi-finals

June 16, 1920

|}

June 23, 1920

|}

Final

July 4, 1920

|}

Austrian Cup seasons
Austrian
Cup